Bokang Mothoana (born 9 December 1987) is a Mosotho footballer who plays for Kick 4 Life.

Club career

Bokang Mothoana, who also goes by the nickname "lefty", started with Likhopo Maseru in 2005. In 2007, he transferred to Union Sportive Monstir for an unknown fee. He was part of the team who won the 2010-11 Ligue 2 by four points and subsequently played for the side in the top division. Mothoana, a left footed player, often played as a left wing-back during his seven years in Tunisia.

Mothoana departed US Monstir in the summer of 2014 due to ongoing political unrest in Tunisia. He trained briefly with the Lesotho national team in June before undergoing unsuccessful trials with South African club Supersport United F.C.

At the start of the 2016/17 season, Mothoana joined Kick4Life, a Lesotho football club and registered charity dedicated to social change. Now playing in a more attacking midfield role, he impressed with a number of important goals and assists as the club finished 4th in the Lesotho Premier League. Mothoana's efforts were recognised at an end of season awards ceremony where he was named Kick4Life player of the season by the club's Academy Director.

Outside Football

On 25 November 2017, Mothoana became the first football player from Lesotho to join Common Goal, pledging one percent of his income to support football charities worldwide. This was confirmed on the organisation's Twitter page shortly afterwards.

International career
Since 2005, he has won 13 caps and scored one goal for the Lesotho national football team.

International goals
Scores and results list Lesotho's goal tally first.

References

1987 births
Living people
People from Maseru
Lesotho footballers
Lesotho international footballers
Association football midfielders
US Monastir (football) players
Expatriate footballers in Tunisia
Lesotho expatriate footballers